‌The 2016 West Asian Women's Handball Championship was the inaugural edition of the championship held under the aegis of Asian Handball Federation. The championship was hosted by Qatar Handball Association at Aspire Dome, Doha (Qatar) from 16 to 19 September 2016.

Qatar won their first title by winning all the matches in a round-robin tournament.

Participating teams
 
 
  (Host)

Round-robin

Final standings

References

External links
Asian Handball Federation

2016
West Asian Women's Handball Championship
West Asian Women's Handball Championship
2016 West Asian Women's Handball Championship
 September 2016 sports events in Asia